Chao Chantharath (1799–23 August 1870) also known as Chandakumara, Chantharad or Tiantha-koumane, was king of Luang Phrabang under Siamese rule from 1852 to 1868.

Chantharath was the second son of Manthathurath. He succeeded his elder brother Sukkhasoem in 1852. During his reign, the kingdom confronted by serious local, regional, and international threats. In 1864, Haw rebels raided the country. He freed Principality of Xiangkhouang (Muang Phuan) from Vietnamese and Haw rebels. In 1828, the Siamese king Mongkut returned the Phra Bang Buddha to Luang Phrabang. He died in 1870. Later, his brother Oun Kham succeeded.

External links

|-

1799 births
1870 deaths
Kings of Luang Phrabang
18th-century Laotian people
19th-century Laotian people